NGC 4606 is a spiral galaxy located about 55 million light-years away in the constellation of Virgo. NGC 4606 was discovered by astronomer William Herschel on March 15, 1784.  It has a disturbed stellar disk suggesting the actions of  gravitational interactions. NGC 4607 may be a possible companion of NGC 4606. However, their redshifts differ by about 600 km/s, making it unlikely that they are a gravitationally bound pair. NGC 4606 is a member of the Virgo Cluster.

See also
 List of NGC objects (4001–5000)

References

External links
 

Spiral galaxies
Virgo (constellation)
4606
42516
7839
Astronomical objects discovered in 1784
Virgo Cluster